Bridge Valley Bridge, also known as Pettit's Bridge and Eight-Arch Bridge, is an historic stone arch bridge located in Warwick Township, Bucks County, Pennsylvania, United States.  It crosses Neshaminy Creek.  It is eight spans, each 27 feet long, and was constructed in 1804.  It is constructed of ashlar stone with rubble and dirt infill.  It remained in vehicular use until 1970.

It was listed on the National Register of Historic Places in 1984.

Gallery

References 
 

Road bridges on the National Register of Historic Places in Pennsylvania
Bridges completed in 1804
Bridges in Bucks County, Pennsylvania
National Register of Historic Places in Bucks County, Pennsylvania
Stone arch bridges in the United States